Christian Schreiner has been Dean of Quebec since 2008.

Schreiner began his ecclesiastical career as a youth leader within the Evangelical Lutheran Church in Bavaria. Later he was a sexton, then pastor in Kolbermoor.

References

Alumni of Emmanuel College, Cambridge
21st-century Anglican priests
Deans of Montreal
Archdeacons of Saint John
People from Beccles
21st-century German Lutheran clergy